William Penn Johnson  (June 1, 1848 – September 25, 1909) was an American professional baseball player for the Cleveland Forest Citys during the 1871 season. Long identified as "Caleb Johnson", the player's true identity was uncovered in 2015 by Society for American Baseball Research member Peter Morris.

References

External links

1848 births
1909 deaths
19th-century baseball players
Major League Baseball second basemen
Cleveland Forest Citys players
Baseball players from Ohio